Brachyiulus bagnalli is a species of millipede in the genus Brachyiulus. It is endemic to Bulgaria.

References
 

Animals described in 1924
Julida
Millipedes of Europe